The 1907 Imperial Conference was convened in London on 15 April 1907 and concluded on 14 May 1907. During the sessions a resolution was passed renaming this and future meetings Imperial Conferences. The chairman of the conference was British prime minister Sir Henry Campbell-Bannerman.

The conference decided to cease referring to self-governing British colonies as colonies and conferred upon them dominion status. Canada and Australia were referred to as dominions in the conference's statements while Newfoundland Colony and the Colony of New Zealand were granted dominion status by royal proclamation on 26 September. Natal and Cape Colony would unite with the two Boer colonies of Orange River Colony and Transvaal Colony, which had been given self-government in 1907, to form the Union of South Africa as a dominion in 1910.

The possibilities of Irish Home Rule and self-governance for India were also discussed. Imperial preference was raised but rejected by the British prime minister due to British support for free trade.

Participants
The conference was hosted by King-Emperor Edward VII, with his prime ministers and members of their respective cabinets:

See also
Imperial Conference

References

External links
Minutes of Proceedings of the Colonial Conference, 1907.

Imperial Conference
1907 in London
Imperial Conference
1907 conferences
1907 in the British Empire
April 1907 events
May 1907 events
Henry Campbell-Bannerman
H. H. Asquith
David Lloyd George
Winston Churchill
Wilfrid Laurier